Canadian singer and songwriter Henry Lau has released three extended plays (EPs) and eighteen singles (and two as featured artist). Debuting as a member of Super Junior-M in 2008, he branched out as a solo artist in 2013 with the release of his first EP Trap. Besides composing songs for his solo releases, he has also produced songs for other artists, television and film soundtracks, and commercials.

Extended plays

Singles

As lead artist

As featured artist

Soundtrack appearances

Other appearances

Compilation appearances

Production credits 
All credits below are sourced from Korea Music Copyright Association (search ID '10002950') and Music Copyright Society of China (search '刘宪华').

Solo work

Other work

Notes

References 

Discographies of Canadian artists